Demeaco D'Vaughn Duhaney (born 13 October 1998) is an English professional footballer who plays for Turkish club İstanbulspor, on loan from Stoke City, as a right back.

Duhaney began his career at Manchester City before signing for Huddersfield Town in 2019, and spent time on loan at Boston United. He has represented England at under-20 youth international level.

Club career

Manchester City
Duhaney is from Fallowfield in Manchester, and joined the Manchester City academy at the age of five. He played regularly for the side that reached the 2017 FA Youth Cup Final, as well as featuring consistently in the UEFA Youth League and Premier League 2 for City's Under-23 side. He made three appearances for the club's under-21 side in the EFL Trophy during the 2017–18 season.

Huddersfield Town
On 17 August 2018, he joined Premier League club Huddersfield Town on a free transfer, agreeing a deal until June 2020. Due to the suspension of regular right-back Tommy Smith, Duhaney made his senior début on 26 February 2019, in a home Premier League victory against Wolverhampton Wanderers. He was substituted at half-time due to potential injury problems, and his performance in the game was praised by manager Jan Siewert.

He joined National League North side Boston United on loan in October 2019, but was recalled in December 2019, after playing seven matches.

Duhaney made six first-team appearances for Huddersfield Town in 2019, including four starts. Huddersfield triggered a one-year contract extension for Duhaney at the end of the 2019–20 season.

He was released by Huddersfield at the end of the 2020–21 season.

Stoke City
In August 2021 he signed a short-term contract with Stoke City until January 2022 following a successful trial period. Duhaney signed a new 18-month contract with Stoke in January 2022.

On 9 September 2022, Duhaney joined Turkish side İstanbulspor on loan for the remainder of the 2022–23 season.

International career
Duhaney appeared on the bench for England Under-18s once, and made two appearances for the under-20 side while with Manchester City, playing in the 2017–18 Under 20 Elite League.

Career statistics

References

1998 births
Living people
Footballers from Manchester
English footballers
England youth international footballers
Manchester City F.C. players
Huddersfield Town A.F.C. players
Boston United F.C. players
Stoke City F.C. players
İstanbulspor footballers
Premier League players
English Football League players
National League (English football) players
Association football fullbacks
Black British sportspeople
English expatriate footballers
English expatriate sportspeople in Turkey
Expatriate footballers in Turkey